Remote Control is a 1988 American science fiction romantic comedy film written and directed by Jeff Lieberman, and starring Kevin Dillon as a Los Angeles video rental clerk who discovers that his store is circulating a VHS tape of a 1950s sci-fi film programmed by aliens to brainwash viewers, causing them to commit murders.

Lieberman's screenplay combines elements of thriller, horror, action films and science fiction with satirical humor. Lieberman did not direct another theatrical feature film for sixteen years, until Satan's Little Helper in 2004.

Plot

A video store clerk (Kevin Dillon) stumbles onto an alien plot to take over Earth by brainwashing people with a faux 1950s science fiction movie. The movie is being rented from the video shop where he works. He and his girlfriend track the production of the fake movie to a movie studio under the control of aliens. They must race to stop the aliens before the tapes can be distributed worldwide.

Release

In 1988, the film was passed uncut with a 15 rating by the BBFC.

Reception
TV Guide gave the film one out of five stars, saying: "It doesn't know whether it wants to be a spoof or a thriller; because of its indecision, it fails on both levels."

Allmovie reviewed the film favorably, writing, "This clever little b-movie is another example of why Jeff Leiberman is a cult favorite in certain genre-movie circles. His script puts a distinctly 1980's twist on the old alien-invasion premise, cleverly managing to make home video seem menacing as he builds up a solid combination of action, sci-fi and horror/thriller elements. Lieberman's direction is unflashy but effective, building tension throughout and frequently offsetting the dark elements of the script with satirical humor."

In Creature Feature, John Stanley gave the movie two out of five stars, but noted its commentary on video and what it does to people's minds.

Home release

Sometime after its theatrical release, International Video Entertainment released the film on VHS. A second release occurred in 1990 under the Avid Home Entertainment label.

In 2013, a 25th Anniversary edition was released on Blu-ray and DVD by director Jeff Lieberman. It has become something of a collector's item.

References

External links

1980s science fiction films
1988 films
Films shot in Los Angeles
American science fiction films
Films directed by Jeff Lieberman
1980s English-language films
1980s American films